Coleophora ptarmicia is a moth of the family Coleophoridae. It is found in Austria, Croatia, Slovakia, the Czech Republic, France, Hungary, Italy (including Sicily), Latvia, Lithuania, southern Russia, and the eastern Palearctic realm. It is also found in China.

The larvae feed on Achillea collina, Achillea millefolium, Achillea ptarmica and Achillea setacea. They create a lobe case of about 7 mm long, covered with large, yellow, leaf fragments widely standing out. The mouth angle is about 40°. Full-grown larvae can be found at the end of May.

References

ptarmicia
Moths of Europe
Moths of Asia
Moths described in 1910